The Spirtovka is a small river in Tomsk Oblast, Russia. Its length is 11 km. It flows into the Parbig, a tributary of the Chaya.

Rivers of Tomsk Oblast
Tributaries of the Ob
Rivers
Geography of Russia